Old Paluvayi is a village in Rentachintala mandal, Guntur district in the Indian state of Andhra Pradesh.

References

Villages in Guntur district
mandalapu hanimireddy sarpanch of the vilage 
s/o latchi reddy